Gorse Hill is an electoral ward of Trafford, Greater Manchester, England. It covers parts of Stretford, including Gorse Hill, most of Trafford Park and a small part of Old Trafford. 

The ward was created in 2004 largely from parts of the old Park and Talbot wards. Gorse Hill ward has always elected Labour councillors by a large margin.

Councillors 
As of 2022, the councillors are David Acton (Labour), Fianna Hornby (Labour), and Laurence Walsh (Labour).

 indicates seat up for re-election.

Elections in the 2020s

May 2022

May 2021

Elections in the 2010s

May 2019

May 2018

May 2016

May 2015

May 2014

May 2012

May 2011

May 2010

Elections in the 2000s

May 2008

May 2007

May 2006

May 2004

References

External links
Trafford Council

Stretford
Wards of Trafford
2004 establishments in England